Bert Van Lerberghe (born 29 September 1992) is a Belgian professional racing cyclist, who currently rides for UCI WorldTeam . He won the combativity classification in the 2016 Eneco Tour.

Major results

2009
 4th Overall Sint-Martinusprijs Kontich
1st Stage 4
2010
 1st Prologue Sint-Martinusprijs Kontich
 2nd Tour of Flanders juniors
2012
 5th Overall Tour du Loir-et-Cher
1st  Young rider classification
 6th Grote Prijs Stad Geel
 8th Kattekoers
2013
 10th Overall Le Triptyque des Monts et Châteaux
 10th Grand Prix de la ville de Nogent-sur-Oise
2014
 2nd Road race, National Under-23 Road Championships
 2nd Grand Prix Criquielion
 8th Grand Prix de la ville de Pérenchies
 9th Overall Le Triptyque des Monts et Châteaux
2015
 4th Antwerpse Havenpijl
 5th Arnhem–Veenendaal Classic
 5th Kattekoers
 6th De Kustpijl
 7th Velothon Berlin
 10th Paris–Bourges
 10th Omloop van het Houtland
2016
 2nd De Kustpijl
 4th Handzame Classic
 5th Grand Prix Criquielion
 6th Kampioenschap van Vlaanderen
 10th Münsterland Giro
 10th Heistse Pijl
2017
 2nd Ronde van Overijssel
 2nd Omloop Eurometropool
 3rd Paris–Troyes
 5th Nokere Koerse
 6th Grote Prijs Marcel Kint
 6th Omloop van het Houtland
 7th Arnhem–Veenendaal Classic
 8th Nationale Sluitingsprijs
 9th Le Samyn
 9th Grand Prix de Denain
2018
 7th Omloop Het Nieuwsblad
 8th Brussels Cycling Classic
2020
 7th Three Days of Bruges–De Panne
2021
 4th Heistse Pijl
 9th Kuurne–Brussels–Kuurne
2022
 4th Nokere Koerse
 8th Le Samyn
 10th Bredene Koksijde Classic
2023
 1st Stage 2 (TTT) UAE Tour

Grand Tour general classification results timeline

References

External links
 

1992 births
Living people
Belgian male cyclists
Sportspeople from Kortrijk
Cyclists from West Flanders